National Highway 731AG, commonly referred to as NH 731AG is a national highway in India. It is a spur road of National Highway 31.  NH-731AG runs in the state of Uttar Pradesh in India.

Route 
NH731AG connects Rajapur, Ramtekra and Raipura in the state of Uttar Pradesh.

Junctions  
 
  Terminal near Rajapur.
  Terminal near Raipura.

See also 
 List of National Highways in India
 List of National Highways in India by state

References

External links 

 NH 731AG on OpenStreetMap

National highways in India
National Highways in Uttar Pradesh